Philip Harding DL FSA (born 25 January 1950) is a British field archaeologist. He became a familiar face on the Channel 4 television series Time Team.

Harding trained on various excavations with the Bristol University Extra Mural Department and other bodies from 1966; he has been a professional archaeologist since 1971.

Life and career

Early life
Born in Oxford on 25 January 1950 and brought up in Wexcombe, Wiltshire, Harding was educated at Marlborough Royal Free Grammar School in Marlborough. As a young boy, he became fascinated with the Stone Age.  He learned flint-knapping from his uncle, Fred, and in only a few months became a skilled knapper, crafting many hunting tools from pieces of flint. He made his first archaeological finds digging up his parents' garden, much to the annoyance of his mother, Elsie. In 1966, while still at school, he attended a training excavation by Bristol University Extra Mural Department in Fyfield and West Overton. Since then, he has dug every year, though at first his archaeological activities had to be fitted into holidays and any spare time.

Career

After Harding left school, he worked in a puppet factory in Marlborough until he became a full-time archaeologist in 1971. He worked initially for the Southampton City Council Archaeology Unit, combining this with five seasons of excavations (1972–1976) run by the British Museum at the Neolithic flint mines of Grimes Graves, Norfolk. He has since become an acknowledged expert on flint-knapping and is skilled in lithic reduction using both percussive techniques and pressure flaking, in which, instead of striking the flint with blows, pressure is exerted on the edges to shape the tool.

From the mid-1970s, he worked on excavations in Berkshire, Hampshire, Dorset, Wiltshire and the Isle of Wight for the Department of the Environment (DOE). In 1979, the archaeological section of the DOE for the region became Wessex Archaeology, a non-profit organisation which is one of the biggest archaeological practices in the country. He continues to work for Wessex Archaeology.

He has been a member of the Institute of Field Archaeologists since 1985, and in 2006 was elected a Fellow of the Society of Antiquaries of London. On 24 July 2008, he received an honorary doctorate from the University of Southampton in archaeology. As a qualified SCUBA diver, he is the president of the Nautical Archaeology Society, a Portsmouth-based charity formed to further interest in nautical cultural heritage. Since 2015, Harding has been an archaeological supervisor for the veteran support charity Waterloo Uncovered, which conducts archaeology on the battlefield of Waterloo alongside veterans and serving personnel.

In 2010, the radio series A History of the World in 100 Objects featured Harding speaking on the creation of pre-historic stone tools.

Television
In 1991, Harding took part in the series Time Signs, which was produced by Tim Taylor, who went on to create Channel 4's popular archaeology series Time Team. Harding was a regular on Time Team from the first series in 1994 until its cancellation in 2013. He also took part in the various spin-off series such as Time Team Extra (1998), Time Team Digs (2002) and Time Team Live. In addition, he has appeared in episodes of Meet the Ancestors (2003) and Chris Moyles' Quiz Night (2009).

He appeared in an episode of BBC's Digging for Britain in December 2016.

Honours

Commonwealth honours
 Commonwealth honours

Appointments

Scholastic

Honorary degrees

Awards

References

External links
Wessex Archaeology
Waterloo Uncovered
The Guardian: Why I love Phil Harding
Lectures by Phil Harding for Waterloo Uncovered Project
Interview with Phil Harding during Salisbury 2020:Digital Big Weekend
Salisbury Sites Blog and Salisbury Uncovered film

1950 births
Deputy Lieutenants of Wiltshire
English archaeologists
Living people
Fellows of the Society of Antiquaries of London
People from Oxford
People from Salisbury
Archaeologists appearing on Time Team
Experimental archaeology
Prehistorians